Betty Kozai (October 12, 1928 – January 18, 2021) was an American curler from Seattle, Washington.

Curling career
Kozai won the US national championship in 1980, on a team skipped by her daughter Sharon. That team went on to finish in fourth place at that year's world championship. She returned to international competition at the age of 81, representing the United States at the 2010 World Senior Curling Championships.

Personal life 
Kozai was a founding member of Granite Curling Club in Seattle, and curled there until the last years of her life. Her three daughters and four grandchildren have also been long-time curlers at Granite.

Teams

Women's

References

External links
 Betty Kozai at USA Curling
 

American female curlers
American curling champions
Sportspeople from Seattle